Literary Impressionism is influenced by the European Impressionist art movement, many writers adopted a style that relied on associations. The Dutch Tachtigers explicitly tried to incorporate impressionism into their prose, poems, and other literary works. Much of what has been called "impressionist" literature is subsumed into several other categories, especially Symbolism, its chief exponents being Baudelaire, Mallarmé, Rimbaud, Verlaine and Laforgue. It focuses on a particular character's perception of events. The edges of reality are blurred by choosing points of view that lie outside the norm.

Impressionistic literature can basically be defined as when an author centers their story/attention on the character's mental life such as the character's impressions, feelings, sensations and emotions, rather than trying to interpret them. Authors such as Virginia Woolf (Mrs Dalloway) and Joseph Conrad (Heart of Darkness and "The Lagoon") are among the foremost creators of the type. These novels have been said to be the finest examples of a genre which is not easily comprehensible.

The term is used to describe a work of literature characterized by the selection of a few details to convey the sense impressions left by an incident or scene. This style of writing occurs when characters, scenes, or actions are portrayed from a subjective point of view of reality.

References

Impressionism
Literary movements